The Genie Music Awards is a music awards show that is held annually in South Korea and organized by Genie Music together with their partner network. The award winners are selected based on chart data from the Genie Music platform, evaluation from judges, and online voting in South Korea.

Ceremonies

Daesang Awards (Grand Prizes)

The Top Artist

The Top Music

The Top Album

Artist Category Awards

The Group Award

The Solo Artist Award

The New Artist Award

Genre-specific Awards

The Performing Artist

Best Ballad Track

Best R&B/Soul Track

Best Hip Hop Artist

Best Trot Track

Best Rock Artist

Best OST Award

Popularity Awards

Genie Music Popularity Award

Global Popularity Award

Other Awards

Best Music Video

Best Pop Artist

Best Record

Special Awards

Best Style Award

Next Generation

Next Generation Global

Next Wave Icon

Discontinued Awards

The Top Best Selling Artist 

M2 Top Video

Best Producer

Best Choreography

Best Fandom

The Innovator

The Performance Creator

The Vocal Artist 

Best Band Performance

MBC Plus Star Award 

M2 Hot Star

Next Generation Star

Best Global Performance

M2 The Most Popular Artist

Discovery of the Year

Most Wins

Notes

References

Genie Music
South Korean music awards
Awards established in 2018
Annual events in South Korea
2018 establishments in South Korea